The 1984 Winnipeg Blue Bombers finished in 2nd place in the West Division with an 11–4–1 record. They closed out the season by winning the Grey Cup 47–17 over the Hamilton Tiger-Cats. Their first Grey Cup victory since 1962.

Offseason

CFL draft

Roster

Preseason

Regular season

Standings

Schedule

Playoffs

West Semi-Final

West Final

Grey Cup

Awards

1984 CFL All-Stars

References

Winnipeg Blue Bombers seasons
N. J. Taylor Trophy championship seasons
Grey Cup championship seasons
1984 Canadian Football League season by team